Tomoe Gozen was an onna-musha from the late Heian period of Japanese history. She served Minamoto no Yoshinaka during the Genpei War and was a part of the conflict that led to the first shogunate. Her family had strong affiliations with Yoshinaka.

Her story in the Tale of the Heike influenced several generations of samurai. Tomoe is often celebrated in books, music, poems, films, historical novels and culture in general.

Early life 
Tomoe's father, Nakahara Kanetō, was a strong supporter and foster father of Yoshinaka, having raised him since he was two. Her mother was Yoshinaka's wet nurse. Two of her elder brothers also served Yoshinaka as generals.

Genpei War 

She commanded, under the leadership of Yoshinaka, 300 samurai against 2,000 warriors of the rival Taira clan during the war. After defeating the Taira in 1182 and driving them into the western provinces, Yoshinaka took Kyoto and desired to be the leader of the Minamoto clan. His cousin Yoritomo was prompted to crush Yoshinaka, and sent his brothers Yoshitsune and Noriyori to kill him. 

Yoshinaka fought Yoritomo's forces at the Battle of Awazu on February 21, 1184, where Tomoe Gozen took at least one head of the enemy. Although Yoshinaka's troops fought bravely, they were outnumbered and overwhelmed. When Yoshinaka was defeated there, with only a few of his soldiers standing, he told Tomoe Gozen to flee because he wanted to die with his foster brother Imai no Shiro Kanehira and he said that he would be ashamed if he died with a woman.

There are varied accounts of what followed. At the Battle of Awazu in 1184, she is known for beheading Honda no Morishige of Musashi. She is also known for having killed Uchida Ieyoshi and for escaping capture by Hatakeyama Shigetada. After Tomoe Gozen beheaded the leader of the Musashi clan, she presented his head to her master Yoshinaka.

Notes

References
 Faure, Bernard (2003). The Power of Denial: Buddhism, Purity, and Gender. Princeton: Princeton University Press. ; ; .
 Joly, Henri L. (1967).  Legend in Japanese Art: A Description of Historical Episodes, Legendary Characters, Folk-lore Myths, Religious Symbolism, Illustrated in the Arts of Old Japan. Rutland, Vermont: Tuttle. ; .
 Kitagawa, Hiroshi and Bruce T. Tsuchida, ed. (1975). The Tale of the Heike. Tokyo: University of Tokyo Press. ; .
 McCullough, Helen Craig (1988). The Tale of the Heike. Palo Alto, California: Stanford University Press. ; .
 Nussbaum, Louis Frédéric and Käthe Roth (2005). Japan Encyclopedia. Cambridge: Harvard University Press. ; .

External links

 Famous Women of Japanese History . The Samurai Archives Japanese History Page.
 Shea, L. "Tomoe Gozen - Female Samurai". Bella Online, 2009.

1150s births
1247 deaths
12th-century Japanese women
13th-century Japanese women
12th-century Japanese people
13th-century Japanese people
Japanese folklore
Japanese women in warfare
Women warriors
Samurai
Minamoto clan
Women of medieval Japan
Women in 12th-century warfare
People of the Genpei War
People of Heian-period Japan